Jacqueline S. Moore (March 19, 1926 – April 11, 2002), often known as Jackie Moore, was an American poet and author of Moments of My Life, a book of poems from her youth through her life including many inspired by her struggle with Parkinson's disease.

Jackie was a Middlebury College, Vermont graduate. She retired from E.I. DuPont where she was employed as a chemist during World War II.

Article:Why Write Poetry

References

External links
Loft Press

1926 births
2002 deaths
Deaths from Parkinson's disease
Neurological disease deaths in Virginia
Middlebury College alumni
20th-century American chemists
American women poets
20th-century American poets
20th-century American women writers